Mishelevka Radar Station is the site of three generations of Soviet and Russian early warning radars. It is located in Irkutsk in Siberia and provides coverage of China and missile launches from submarines in the Pacific Ocean. There have been seven radars at this site and it is run by the Russian Aerospace Defence Forces. In 2012 a new Voronezh-M radar is being built at the site.

The military town for the station is called Usolye-Sibirskoye-7.

Space surveillance

Mishelevka was founded as OS-1, a space surveillance site with four Dnestr radar, which were started in 1964  and tested in 1968.

In 1967-8 a Dnepr early warning radar was started adjacent to the 4 Dnestr radars and it was commissioned in 1976.

One of the Dnestr space surveillance radars is now used as an incoherent scatter radar by the Institute of Solar-Terrestrial Physics, part of the Russian Academy of Sciences.

Second generation Daryal radar

The system is a VHF system operating at a wavelength of 1.5 to 2 meters (150 to 200 MHz).

Two Daryal-U type radars were to be built at sites in Balkhash and Mishelevka, Irkutsk, neither were completed. In 1999 the American Clinton administration offered financial assistance in completing the Mishelevka facility in exchange for amending the ABM treaty to allow US deployment of a national missile defense system. Russia rejected this proposal and in 2002 the US unilaterally withdrew from the ABM treaty.

The Mishelevka Daryal was started in 1979 and construction ended in 1984. It was never operational and was demolished in 2011.

Third generation Voronezh radar

The Daryal radar was demolished on 23 June 2011  to enable the construction of a new Voronezh radar. There are going to be two radar faces on the site to replace the two Dnepr radars which, as of 2012, are still operational. Once complete the MoD say that the radar will have coverage of 240°.

Voronezh radar are highly prefabricated radars needing fewer personnel and using less energy than previous generations. The VP stands for high potential and may reflect that it has six segments, rather than the three of other Voronezh VHF radars.

The first face of the new radar was announced as undergoing testing in March 2012. In May 2012 it was announced that it had entered "experimental combat duty". Fully operational in 2014.

External links
Photo of the Mishelevka Daryal
Photo of the Mishelevka Voronezh under construction
Video of the opening of the Voronezh, May 2012 (in Russian)
Photo set of a Dnepr from Novosti Kosmonavtiki, May 2012  
Photo set of the Voronezh from Novosti Kosmonavtiki, May 2012

References

Russian Space Forces
Russian and Soviet military radars
Military installations of Russia
Military installations of the Soviet Union
Ra
Buildings and structures in Irkutsk Oblast